Marc Matthews (born 1940s) is a Guyanese writer, actor, broadcaster and producer.

Biography
Marc Matthews was born in British Guiana in the 1940s. He received, he reports, "a mid-Victorian education" at Queen's College, Georgetown.

He worked as an operator, producer and presenter on Radio Demerara, as a scriptwriter and documentary researcher/ presenter for Guyana Broadcasting Service, and as a tutor in drama at the Cyril Potter Teachers Training College. He was a co-director/founder of Jaiai Independent Broadcasting Unit, and with Peter Kempadoo produced Our Kind Of Folk for radio in Guyana.

In the 1960s Marc Matthews was in London as a freelance reporter, involved with the UK Black Power movement and alternative theatre productions. He was closely involved with the Caribbean Artists Movement (CAM), being, along with Linton Kwesi Johnson, one of the most prominent younger poets to come out of CAM in the 1970s. Unlike with Johnson, Matthews's pioneering role as a nation language performance poet has not been fully recognised, perhaps because his roots and material were always more Guyanese than Black British. Similarly, because of its nature as live theatre rather than as published scripts, his important work, first with fellow Guyanese Ken Corsbie in Dem Two in 1974,<ref>"Gaffing with Kraws", Stabroek News", 2 August 2010.</ref> then in 1975 in All Ah We, which added John Agard and Henry Muttoo, has largely vanished from the record, if not the memory of those who witnessed them. Only Matthews's record Marc-Up (1987) survives as a record of those days.Vibert C. Cambridge, "Profiles of Caribbean Artistry: Caribbean Voices 6 - Marc-Up The CD", eCaroh Caribbean Emporium.

As the tyranny of the Burnham years worsened, Matthews settled in the United Kingdom, though he made one attempt to return to live in Guyana after the return of democratic government in the 1990s. In 1987, he won the Guyana Prize for his first collection of poetry, Guyana My Altar (Karnak House, 1987). (Kairi in Trinidad had produced an early unbound pamphlet by Matthews, Eleven O'Clock Goods, in 1974.) His collection A Season of Sometimes was published by Peepal Tree Press in 1992. His work has also been anthologized in collections such as The Heinemann Book of Caribbean Poetry (1992) and The Penguin Book of Caribbean Verse in English.

Around 2005 Matthews, working under the pseudonym "Tramping Man", formed a musical collaboration named Burn Brothers with two London-based producers, Jean Philippe Altier and Adam Hoyle. They were joined by saxophonist Florian Brand and performed a number of gigs in and around London in 2007. A record entitled Fire Exit was recorded and released in April 2008.

Selected bibliography
 Eleven O'Clock Goods, Kairi, 1974.
 Guyana My Altar (poetry), Karnak House, 1987.
 A Season of Sometimes'', Peepal Tree Press, 1992

References

External links
 Marc Matthews – “Jumbie Picnic” video, Guyanese Online.
 "Small Boys" by Marc Matthews, Geoffrey Philp, 18 July 2008.
 Marc Matthews, "Guyana Not Ghana", 24 September 2008

Guyanese writers
1940s births
Living people
Spoken word artists
20th-century Guyanese writers
Caribbean Artists Movement people
Guyanese actors
Recipients of the Wordsworth McAndrew Award